The standard penetration test (SPT) is an in-situ dynamic penetration test designed to provide information on the geotechnical engineering properties of soil. This test is the most frequently used subsurface exploration drilling test performed worldwide. The test procedure is described in ISO 22476-3, ASTM D1586 and Australian Standards AS 1289.6.3.1.
The test provides samples for identification purposes and provides a measure of penetration resistance which can be used for geotechnical design purposes. Many local and widely published international correlations which relate blow count, or N-value, to the engineering properties of soils are available for geotechnical engineering purposes.

Procedure 
The test uses a thick-walled sampling tube, with an outside diameter of 5.08 cm and an inside diameter of 3.5 cm, and a length of around 65 cm. The sampling tube is driven into the ground at the bottom of a borehole by blows from a slide hammer with a mass of 63.5 kg (140 lb) falling a distance of 76 cm (30 in). The sample tube is driven a total of 45 cm into the ground and the number of blows needed for the tube to penetrate each 15 cm (6 in) interval up to a depth of 45 cm (18 in) is recorded. The sum of the number of blows required for the second and third 15 cm (6 in) intervals of penetration is termed the "standard penetration resistance" or the "N-value". The test may be aborted if a total of 50 blows have been applied in any one of the 15 cm (6 in) intervals, a total of 100 blows have been applied over the total 45 cm (18 in) depth or there is no observed advance of the sampling tube during 10 successive blows. The blow count provides an indication of the density of the ground, and it is used in many empirical geotechnical engineering formulae.

Purpose 
The main purpose of the test is to provide an indication of the relative density of granular deposits, such as sands and gravels from which it is virtually impossible to obtain undisturbed samples.  The great merit of the test, and the main reason for its widespread use, is that it is simple and inexpensive. The soil strength parameters which can be inferred are approximate, but may give a useful guide in ground conditions where it may not be possible to obtain borehole samples of adequate quality like gravels, sands, silts, clay containing sand or gravel and weak rock. In conditions where the quality of the undisturbed sample is suspect, e.g., very silty or very sandy clay, or hard clay, it is often advantageous to alternate the sampling with standard penetration tests to check the strength. If the samples are found to be unacceptably disturbed, it may be necessary to use a different method for measuring strength like the plate test.  When the test is carried out in granular soils below groundwater level, the soil may become loosened. In certain circumstances, it can be useful to continue driving the sampler beyond the distance specified, adding further drilling rods as necessary. Although this is not a standard penetration test, and should not be regarded as such, it may at least give an indication as to whether the deposit is really as loose as the standard test may indicate.

The usefulness of SPT results depends on the soil type, with fine-grained sands giving the most useful results, with coarser sands and silty sands giving reasonably useful results, and clay and gravelly soils yielding results which may be very poorly representative of the true soil conditions.  Soils in arid areas, such as the Western United States, may exhibit natural cementation.  This condition will often increase the standard penetration value.

The SPT is used to provide results for empirical determination of a sand layer's susceptibility to soil liquefaction, based on research performed by Harry Seed, T. Leslie Youd, and others.

Correlation with soil mechanical properties
Despite its many flaws, it is usual practice to correlate SPT results with soil properties relevant for geotechnical engineering design. SPT results are in-situ field measurements, and not as subject to sample disturbance, and are often the only test results available, therefore the use of correlations has become common practice in many countries.

An approximate relationship cited in the US Army Corps of Engineers engineering manual publication on sheet pile design developed after Terzaghi and Peck (1948) and Teng (1962), shows in the table below the relationship specifically for SPT N values and bulk density of soil correlated to relative density and referred to in the engineering manual as moist unit weight in pcf units, converted to metric values in the table

Problems
The standard penetration test recovers a highly disturbed sample, which is generally not suitable for tests which measure properties of the in-situ soil structure, such as density, strength, and consolidation characteristics. To overcome this limitation, the test is often run with a larger sampler with a slightly different tip shape, so the disturbance of the sample is minimized, and testing of structural properties is meaningful for all but soft soils. However, this results in blow counts which are not easily converted to SPT N-values – many conversions have been proposed, some of which depend on the type of soil sampled, making reliance on blow counts with non-standard samplers problematic.

Standard penetration test blow counts do not represent a simple physical property of the soil, and thus must be correlated to soil properties of interest, such as strength or density. There exist multiple correlations, none of which are of very high quality. Use of SPT data for direct prediction of liquefaction potential suffers from roughness of correlations and from the need to "normalize" SPT data to account for overburden pressure, sampling technique, and other factors. Additionally, the method cannot collect accurate data for weak soil layers for several reasons:
 The results are limited to whole numbers for a specific driving interval, but with very low blow counts, the granularity of the results, and the possibility of a zero result, makes handling the data cumbersome.
 In loose sands and very soft clays, the act of driving the sampler will significantly disturb the soil, including by soil liquefaction of loose sands, giving results based on the disturbed soil properties rather than the intact soil properties.

A variety of techniques have been proposed to compensate for the deficiencies of the standard penetration test, including the Cone penetration test, in-situ vane shear tests, and shear wave velocity measurements.

See also
 Cone penetration test
 Geotechnical investigation
 Soil mechanics

References
Knappet, J.A. & Craig, R.F. (2012) Craig's Soil Mechanics. 8th ed. Abingdon: Spon Press.
Braatvedt, I. (2008) A Guide to Practical Geotechnical Engineering in Southern Africa. 4th ed. Cape Town: VIVO Design Associates.
Holtz, R.D. & Kovacs, W.D. (1981) An Introduction to Geotechnical Engineering. New Jersey: Prentice-Hall.
Zatuwa, Monosagu (2005) Beware, soft ground and the standard penetration test  (in Japanese) Public Works Research Institute
 University of Missouri – Rolla Class notes on the SPT.

In situ geotechnical investigations
Articles containing video clips